Horné Obdokovce is a municipality in the Topoľčany District of the Nitra Region, Slovakia. The municipality consists of three parts (settlements) - Obsolovce, Bodok and Dolina. In 2011 it had 1556 inhabitants

See also
 List of municipalities and towns in Slovakia

References

Genealogical resources

The records for genealogical research are available at the state archive "Statny Archiv in Nitra, Slovakia"

 Roman Catholic church records (births/marriages/deaths): 1727-1896 (parish B)

External links

 Official page
http://en.e-obce.sk/obec/horneobdokovce/horne-obdokovce.html
Surnames of living people in Horne Obdokovce

Villages and municipalities in Topoľčany District